Muḥammad bin al-Ḥasan bin Muḥammad bin al-Karīm al-Baghdadi, usually called al-Baghdadi (d. 1239 AD), was the compiler of an early Arab cookbook of the Abbasid period, كتاب الطبيخ  Kitab al-Ṭabīḫ (The Book of Dishes), written in 1226. The original book contained 160 recipes, and 260 recipes were later added.

Manuscripts and Turkish translations
The only original manuscript of Al-Baghdadi's book survives at Süleymaniye Library in Istanbul, Turkey, and according to Charles Perry, "for centuries, it had been the favorite cook-book of the Turks". Further recipes had been added to the original by Turkish compilers at an unknown date and retitled as Kitâbü’l-Vasfi’l-Et‘ime el-Mu‘tâde, with two of its known three copies found at the Topkapı Palace Library. Eventually, Muhammad ibn Mahmud al-Shirwani, the physician of Murad II, prepared a Turkish translation of the book adding around 70 contemporary recipes. This translation was published in modern Turkish in 2005, whereas a modern Turkish translation of the original book (co-edited by Charles Perry) was published in 2009.

See also

 Ibn Sayyar al-Warraq, author of a 10th-century Arabic cookbook by the same name

References

Bibliography

 A.J. Arberry, "A Baghdad cookery-book", Islamic Culture 13 (1939), pp. 21–47 and 189–214. A translation of al-Kitab al-Ṭabīḫ.
 Charles Perry, A Baghdad Cookery Book (Petits Propos Culinaires), Prospect Books, 2006. . A new translation.

Arabic literature
Iraqi male writers
1239 deaths
Arab cuisine
13th-century Arabic writers
13th-century people from the Abbasid Caliphate
Writers from Baghdad
Year of birth unknown
Cookbook writers of the medieval Islamic world
Culture of the Abbasid Caliphate